The Princeton Footnotes are a low-voice a cappella group from Princeton University in Princeton, New Jersey. The Footnotes are a student-run, semi-professional performance group that generally consists of ten to twenty members. The Footnotes hold auditions for first-years and sophomores twice during the school year. They are a part of Princeton University's "Acaprez" a cappella organization, which includes the Nassoons, Tigertones, Katzenjammers, Roaring Twenty, Tigerlilies, Tigressions, and Wildcats.

The Footnotes came in third in the National Collegiate A Cappella Championship Semi-Final in 2000. The group also was recognized by the Contemporary A Cappella Society through their selection of the Footnotes' rendition of "Boogie Down" for their "Best of College A Cappella Volume 1" album. They have performed for President George H. W. Bush at the White House, Lee Iacocca at Chrysler, and the New Jersey Lottery.

They appeared on Season Four of The Sing-Off.

In 2014, the Footnotes were selected for BOCA's "Best of BOCA: The First 20 Years" album for their arrangement of "Boogie Down" by Al Jarreau.

Music 
The Footnotes perform a wide range of musical styles, including jazz, classical, and pop. The group's repertoire is chosen and arranged by members. Though mostly constituted of cover songs, the group occasionally performs originals written by members of the group.

Recent Albums

It's Always Like This (2019) 

Tracks:
 Crazy
 Attention
 Castle on the Hill
 Homeward Bound
 Who Loves You / December, 1963
 Royals
 Seven Bridges Road
 Valerie
 Moonshine Lullaby
 Stitches
 Waving Through a Window
 I Knew You Were Trouble
 All I Ask for Is You
 Boogie Down

Considerous Deliberation (2017) 

Tracks:
 Seven Nation Army
 Ignition (Remix)
 Shangri-La
 Honeymoon Avenue
 Colder Weather
 New York, New York
 Love Yourself
 Survivor
 When Daybreak Comes
 7 Years
 Pusher Love Girl
 All I Ask For Is You

Under the Mistletoes [EP] (2015) 

Tracks:
 All I Want for Christmas is You
 Deck The Halls / I'll Be Home for Christmas
 White Christmas
 Text Me Merry Christmas (Feat. The Princeton Tigerlilies)

Uptown Funk [Single] (2015) 

Tracks:
 Uptown Funk

The Footnotes / The Orange Album (2014) 

Tracks:
 I Want You Back
 Skyfall
 If You Could Read My Mind
 Everything
 I Get a Kick Out of You
 New Shoes
 Mirrors
 Up the Ladder to the Roof
 Make You Feel My Love
 Some Nights
 All I Ask For Is You

Tours and Performances 
As part of Princeton University's "Acaprez" a cappella organization, the Footnotes usually perform every other week at Arch Sings with other member groups.

In addition to on-campus performances, the Footnotes traditionally go on two performance tours each year. Recent tours have included visits to California (2018), Montreal (2017), Italy (2017), Florida (2016), and Japan (2016).

Notable alumni 
Joel Rosenman
Edward Thomas Ryan
George T. Whitesides

References

External links 
http://www.princetonfootnotes.com - Official Website
https://www.instagram.com/ptnfootnotes/ - Instagram Page
https://www.facebook.com/footnotes/ - Facebook Page
https://twitter.com/ptnfootnotes?lang=en - Twitter Page
https://www.youtube.com/user/princetonfootnotes/videos - YouTube Channel

American vocal groups
Collegiate a cappella groups
Footnotes, Princeton
Musical groups established in 1959
1959 establishments in New Jersey